is a Japanese professional footballer who plays for J.League club Nagoya Grampus. 
A versatile midfielder, Sakai can play in many different positions, although left wing is his preferred position.

He is the younger brother of current Vissel Kobe player and former Albirex Niigata teammate Gotoku Sakai.

Career
On 2 November 2010, Sakai signed for J. League club Albirex Niigata. He made his J. League debut on 7 May 2011, coming on as a substitute for Yoshiyuki Kobayashi against Omiya Ardija.

Club statistics

References

External links
Profile at Nagoya Grampus

1992 births
Living people
Association football people from Niigata Prefecture
Japanese footballers
J1 League players
J2 League players
Albirex Niigata players
Avispa Fukuoka players
Fagiano Okayama players
Omiya Ardija players
Nagoya Grampus players
Japanese people of German descent
Association football forwards